Nelly Ramassamy (born ) is a French female artistic gymnast, representing her nation at international competitions.

She participated at the 2000 Summer Olympics. 
She also competed at world championships, including the 1999 World Artistic Gymnastics Championships, and 2003 World Artistic Gymnastics Championships.

References

External links

1983 births
Living people
French female artistic gymnasts
Place of birth missing (living people)
Gymnasts at the 2000 Summer Olympics
Olympic gymnasts of France
21st-century French women